The Tomashevich Pegas was a World War II Soviet ground attack prototype aircraft built before the Battle of Kursk (1943), designed to destroy tanks and German vehicles.

Development and design
Dmitri Lyudvigovich Tomashevich was the chief designer on the Polikarpov I-180 fighter before the crash of the prototype, killing test pilot Valery Chkalov, led to Tomashevich being arrested and sent to a NKVD-run Special Prison in January 1939, where he assisted Andrei Tupolev in the design of the Tupolev Tu-2.

In August 1941, Tomashevich was evacuated to Omsk in Siberia where he was put in charge of his own design bureau. In 1942, inspired by the success of the simple Polikarpov Po-2 biplane as a night ground-attack aircraft, Tomashyevich was authorised to design and build a simple ground-attack aircraft that would be much more capable than the Po-2 but could be built at the same price.

The resulting design was a low-wing monoplane with a fixed tail-wheel undercarriage, of wooden construction, with pine frames and birch plywood skins. The pilot sat in an open cockpit which was protected by mild-steel armour plating designed to withstand  bullets. An optional jettisonable upper wing was tested on the Pegas-01 prototype.

The first prototype, Pegas-01, made its maiden flight in late 1942, proving to be overweight and underpowered, although the aircraft's handling was acceptable. It was hoped to test one of the prototypes at the Kursk front, but the distance from Omsk to the front line made that impractical, and development of the type was abandoned after four prototypes had been built.

Specifications

References

External links
 Pegas

1940s Soviet attack aircraft
World War II Soviet ground attack aircraft
Low-wing aircraft
Aircraft first flown in 1942
Twin piston-engined tractor aircraft